Maureen Tuimalealiifano (born 17 October 1970 in Saleimoa, Samoa) is a Samoan archer. She competed in the individual event at the 2012 Summer Olympics and was eliminated in the Round of 64 after she lost 0–6 to South Korea's Lee Sung-jin. Starting the sport 8 months before the Olympics while she was manager at the Samoan Bank, she made rapid progress with the help (for 1 month) of a Chinese coach. Tuimalealiifano, is looking forward to getting sponsorship and competing at Rio 2016.

References

External links
 

Samoan female archers
1970 births
Living people
Archers at the 2012 Summer Olympics
Olympic archers of Samoa